The following is a list of people who are considered a "father" or "mother" (or "founding father" or "founding mother") of a scientific field. Such people are generally regarded to have made the first significant contributions to and/or delineation of that field; they may also be seen as "a" rather than "the" father or mother of the field. Debate over who merits the title can be perennial.

Science as a whole

Natural sciences

Biology

Chemistry

Earth sciences

Medicine and physiology

Physics and astronomy

Formal sciences

Mathematics

Systems theory

Social sciences

Economics

Schools of thought

Theories

See also 
 Founders of statistics

Notes

References 

list